Eddie Kadi (born 18 May 1983 in Kinshasa) is a British-Congolese comedian, presenter and actor.

Early life
A resident of South-West London since 1992, he is a past student of Fulham Primary School, Henry Compton Secondary School, William Morris Academy and Kingston University from which he graduated with BSc Honours in Media Technology. Kadi served as President of the Afro-Caribbean Society at the University.

Career

Comedy
Kadi won the BECA Award for Best Comedy Newcomer In 2006. He was the first Black British solo comedian to sell out London's IndigO2 – two of those during 2009. In September 2010, he performed at London's O2 Arena where he sold out the 13,000 seat arena. He has since made appearances around the world including The Joburgh Comedy festival, Africa Laughs in Uganda, night of a thousand laughs in Ghana, as well the AMVCAs broadcast across all 54 states in Africa live from Nigeria.

Kadi joined hiphop star Lauryn Hill at the prestigious venue Radio City Music hall in New York City performing stand up comedy in 2017 followed up with Lauryn Hill and Nas on their powernomic tour in the US, performing stand up comedy across various states. 

He hosted the historical Mo Gilligan and friends at the O2 arena in 2021.

Broadcasting
Kadi is a presenter on BBC Radio 1Xtra on the Official UK Afrobeats Charts Show,
and appeared as team captain on series 3 of ITV’s comedy panel show Sorry, I Didn't Know.
He is a regular contributor on BBC Radio 5 Live's sports comedy panel show Fighting Talk.
He also co-hosted Amazon Music +44 Podcast The Noughties alongside Nadia Jae.

Acting
Kadi's work as a voiceover artist includes a characterisation in the Tiger-Aspect-produced animated TV series Tinga Tinga Tales.

His film projects include the lead role in the short film Area Boys (2007),
shot in Africa (Lagos, Nigeria) and premiered at the 51st London Film Festival.
He also appears as Reggy in Shank (2010);
the parking attendant, Tunde, in Anuvahood (2011);
and the Radio DJ in Gone Too Far! (2013).

Music
Kadi has also featured vocally alongside UK Hip Hop Artist Sway and was invited to Senegal in 2008 to host the inauguration of the Senegalese rap artist Akon on his "Konfidence Foundation". He has been heavily Involved in the rise of afrobeats and its presence in the UK.

He has hosted various concerts including Wizkid, Davido, Burnaboy and many other artists. Kadi joined Wizkid, Yemi Alade and Harmonize on an Australian tour as the host. He has presented The All Africa Music awards in 2019 and 2021 alongside South African superstar Pearl Thusi.

Kadi is the current host of the biggest Afrobeats festival in the world Afronation.

References

External links
Eddie Kadi website
The Official UK Afrobeats Chart Show with Eddie Kadi (BBC Radio 1Xtra)

BBC Radio 1Xtra presenters
Black British male comedians
British radio personalities
British radio DJs
1983 births
Living people
British television presenters
British male film actors
Black British male actors
Democratic Republic of the Congo emigrants to England
People from Kinshasa
British male voice actors
People from Fulham